is a Japanese women's professional shogi player ranked 2-dan.

Promotion history
The promotion history for Yamaguchi is given below.
 2-kyū: April 1, 2008
 1-kyū: March 25, 2009
 1-dan: April 1, 2010
 2-dan: May 25, 2016

Note: All ranks are women's professional ranks.

References

External links
ShogiHub: Professional Player Info · Yamaguchi, Eriko

 YouTube: 女流棋士 山口恵梨子ちゃんねる

Japanese shogi players
Living people
Women's professional shogi players
Professional shogi players from Tottori Prefecture
1991 births
Shogi YouTubers
Japanese YouTubers